The Bonaparte River is a tributary of the Thompson River, joining it at the community of Ashcroft, British Columbia. Rising on the Silwhoiakun Plateau to the northwest of Kamloops, the Bonaparte River flows west and south to join the Thompson River.

The river's name first appears on a map made in 1827 by Archibald McDonald of the Hudson's Bay Company. The name probably honors Napoleon Bonaparte, who died in 1821. The Secwepemc name for the river is Kluhtows, which means "gravelly river".

See also
 List of tributaries of the Fraser River

References

Rivers of the Cariboo
Bonaparte Country
Thompson Country